Walton Academy may refer to:
Walton Academy, Grantham
Civil Services Academy Lahore